Khair Khāna is a neighborhood in north west Kabul, Afghanistan, part of District 11. It is predominantly a residential suburb about 6 km from central Kabul, with a boom of high rise constructions and modern apartments, as the area has seen major redevelopments. To its southwest is the Shamāli Square and the Kabul-Charikar highway.the most people were live there is Tajik. Khair khana has a beautiful park in that part of Kabul there are lots of Hospitals, Schools the privets and the Governmental school’s , Private courses, And a very famous place for shopping were has a lots of markets. This neighborhood has been considered as one most populated areas of Kabul city.

History 
Construction of Khair Khāna began during the late 1960s and early 1970s, as a plan to expand the city of Kabul. It mostly consists of regular blocks and paved road grids. Many of its residents are ethnic Tajiks from the provinces north of Kabul.

Khair Khana mostly survived the ordeal of the Afghan Civil War (1992–96) which destroyed most of Kabul, with the neighborhood remaining largely intact. Many people from other parts of Kabul came here to take shelter. One of the reasons why Khair Khana was spared is because of its north-western location – it was far from the Hezb-i Islami Gulbuddin forces who were attacking the city from the south-east, and in later years the Taliban who were based to the south.

References 

Neighborhoods of Kabul